Michael Joseph Papi (born September 19, 1992) is an American professional baseball outfielder who is a free agent. Papi attended the University of Virginia, where he played college baseball for the Virginia Cavaliers. In his collegiate career, he was named an All-American. He previously played professionally in the Cleveland Indians organization.

Career
Papi attended Tunkhannock Area High School in Tunkhannock, Pennsylvania. He played for the school's baseball team, competing in the Wyoming Valley Conference. With Tunkhannock, Papi was a member of two consecutive district champions, and his 2011 team reached the state championship. The Los Angeles Angels of Anaheim selected Papi in the 30th round of the 2011 Major League Baseball draft, but he opted not to sign with the Angels.

Papi enrolled at the University of Virginia, and played college baseball for the Virginia Cavaliers baseball team. In 2013, his sophomore year, Papi led the Atlantic Coast Conference (ACC) with a .381 batting average. Papi was selected to the First All-ACC team and was named an All-American by the American Baseball Coaches Association and Baseball America. He was named a preseason All-American by the National Collegiate Baseball Writers Association in 2014.

Cleveland Indians
The Cleveland Indians selected Papi with the 38th overall selection of the 2014 Major League Baseball draft. Papi signed with the Indians, receiving a $1.25 million signing bonus, and made his professional debut with the Mahoning Valley Scrappers. After two games with Mahoning Valley, the Indians promoted Papi to the Lake County Captains. He got off to a slow start with Lake County, and finished the Lake County season with a .178 batting average. Papi was assigned to the Lynchburg Hillcats in 2015 and spent the whole season there,
posting a .236 batting average with four home runs and 45 RBIs. He began the 2016 season with Lynchburg and was promoted to the Akron RubberDucks in June. Papi ended 2016 with a combined .231 batting average, 15 home runs and 58 RBIs in 118 games between both teams. In 2017, he played for both Akron and the Columbus Clippers, batting a combined .258 with 12 home runs and 55 RBIs in 124 games between both clubs. He spent the 2018 season with the Clippers, hitting .247 with seven home runs and 26 RBIs in 83 games.

Papi was released by the Indians on May 29, 2020.

Gastonia Honey Hunters
On May 21, 2021, Papi signed with the Gastonia Honey Hunters of the Atlantic League of Professional Baseball. He became a free agent following the season.

See also
2013 College Baseball All-America Team

References

External links

1992 births
Living people
People from Tunkhannock, Pennsylvania
Baseball players from Pennsylvania
Baseball outfielders
Virginia Cavaliers baseball players
All-American college baseball players
Mahoning Valley Scrappers players
Lake County Captains players
Lynchburg Hillcats players
Akron RubberDucks players
Columbus Clippers players